Adhikarimayum Sharda Devi is a politician and teacher from Manipur, India who served as National Vice President of Bharatiya Janata Party from 2014 to 2016 and currently serving as the State President of Bharatiya Janta Party of Manipur. She is the first woman President of Bharatiya Janata Party.

References 

Living people
Rashtriya Swayamsevak Sangh members
Bharatiya Jana Sangh politicians
Year of birth missing (living people)